Oscar Martinez Salan (born 21 August 1996) is a Spanish male badminton player.

Achievements

BWF International Challenge/Series 
Mixed doubles

  BWF International Challenge tournament
  BWF International Series tournament
  BWF Future Series tournament

References

External links 
 

Living people
1996 births
Spanish male badminton players